Munis Dundar ("Dündar" in Turkish) is a professor of Medical Genetics and Head of the Medical Genetics Department at Erciyes University, Kayseri, Turkey. He is founder and head of the Medical Genetics Department at Erciyes University and  has carried out various administrative tasks since 1996. He defined four genetic syndromes in the medical literature: the “Dundar Syndrome”, “Dundar Acropectoral Syndrome”, “Scoliosis, Blindness and Arachnodactyly Syndrome” and “Multiple Congenital Abnormalities and Mental Retardation Syndrome”. He has taken part as project coordinator and assistant investigator in many research projects and  has prepared articles published in international journals since 1995. He is the president of EBTNA (European Biotechnology Thematic Network Association) and representative from Turkey. He is also the editor-in-chief of The EuroBiotech Journal.

Research Interest:
Basic Principle in the Genetic Diseases and Clinic Applications, 
Basic Principle in the Medical Genetics,
Mendelian and Nonmendeilan Inheritance, 
Population Genetics, 
Dysmorphology,
Chromosomal Diseases, 
Genetic Counseling,  
Prenatal Diagnosis Methods, 
Transgenic Mouse Generation and Biotechnology, 
Cytogenetics,
Molecular Cytogenetics.

Professional memberships

Publications and Defined Syndromes
There are more than 150 articles in which Munis Dundar is corresponding or co-author including researches on new syndromes defined by himself:

All syndromes are in International Catalogs such as, Online Mendelian Inheritance in Man and Oxford Medical Databases.

Dundar Syndrome

Dundar et al. described patients with Mental Motor Retardation, ocular abnormality, dysmorphic facial appearance, long fingers, and distal arthrogryposis with severely adducted thumbs and clubfeet in Turkish family in 1997.

Dundar Acropectoral Syndrome

In 2001 family with a distal limb and sternal abnormalities were reported by Dundar et al. This autosomal dominant disease signs which are syndactyly, preaxial polydactyly prominent and upper sternum were established in affected individuals. Dundar et al. (2001) noticed similarities with F syndrome but significant differences proved otherwise.OMIM 605967

Scoliosis, Arachnodactyly and Blindness Syndrome

In 2008 Dundar et al. described Turkish family with dominantly-inherited blindness, scoliosis and arachnodactyly.

Multiple Congenital Abnormalities and Mental Retardation Syndrome

Two brothers with abnormal neurological development, short height, pylorus stenosis, pectus excavatum, craniosynostosis, large ears, thin upper lip and bilateral cryptorchidism were reported by Dundar et al. in 2012. While investigating these symptoms were concluded that the summary of findings is not seen in known syndromes and because of non-affected parents who are siblings, this is an autosomal recessive inherited new syndrome.

Books

Awards

References

External links
 

1961 births
Living people
Turkish geneticists
Academic staff of Erciyes University